Zalman can refer to:

 Zalman Tech Co., a Korean computer product company 
 Zalman (name), a variant of Solomon formerly common among Eastern European Jews